Statistics of SEGAS Championship in the 1908–09 season.

Overview
Peiraikos Syndesmos won the championship.

Reported Final Table
1.Peiraikos Syndesmos Pireas
2.Goudi F.C Athens
3.Podosferikos Omilos Athinon (P.O.A)
4.Ethnikos G.S. Athens

References

 

Panhellenic Championship seasons
Greece
1908–09 in Greek football